Springfield Mill, also known as the Piper-Streeper Mill, is a historic gristmill located along the Wissahickon Creek in Erdenheim, Springfield Township, Montgomery County, Pennsylvania. It is a building on the Bloomfield Farm tract, now part of Morris Arboretum.

Springfield Mill is open to the public once a month for grinding demonstrations.

The mill was built in 1854, and is a -story, stone-and-frame mill building measuring 35 feet, 3 inches, by 40 feet, 8 inches.  The mill was built on the foundations of an earlier mill built in 1761.  Also on the property is the miller's house; a -story, four-bay building built about 1845 in the Greek Revival style.

It was added to the National Register of Historic Places in 1976.

References

External links
 Springfield Mills at Morris Arboretum

Grinding mills on the National Register of Historic Places in Pennsylvania
Greek Revival houses in Pennsylvania
Houses completed in 1845
Industrial buildings completed in 1854
Grinding mills in Montgomery County, Pennsylvania
Museums in Montgomery County, Pennsylvania
Mill museums in Pennsylvania
National Register of Historic Places in Montgomery County, Pennsylvania
1854 establishments in Pennsylvania